The Krippenbach  is a small river of Saxony, Germany. It is a left tributary of the Elbe, which it joins in Krippen, near Bad Schandau. It has an elevation of 136 meters. Its name comes from Krippen, a small fishing hamlet on the river. It was used to power mills in hamlets and villages.

See also
List of rivers of Saxony

Rivers of Saxony
Rivers of Germany